Line 10 is a Luxembourgian railway line connecting Luxembourg City to the centre and north of the country, as well as on to Liège, in Belgium. The terminus at the southern end is Luxembourg railway station, whilst the terminals at the northern end are Diekirch, Wiltz, Troisvierges and Liège. It is designated and predominantly operated by the Société Nationale des Chemins de Fer Luxembourgeois (CFL).

History
On 21 July 1862, the Chemins de fer de l'Est opened the line section from Luxembourg railway station to Ettelbruck railway station to commercial traffic. On 15 December 1866, the line was extended to Troisvierges railway station before reaching the Belgian border and Gouvy railway station on 20 February 1867.

Stations
 Luxembourg
 Pfaffenthal-Kirchberg
 Dommeldange
 Walferdange
 Heisdorf
 Lorentzweiler
 Lintgen
 Mersch
 Cruchten
 Colmar-Berg
 Schieren
 Ettelbruck
 Diekirch
 Michelau
 Goebelsmuhle
 Kautenbach
 Merkholtz
 Paradiso
 Wiltz
 Wilwerwiltz
 Drauffelt
 Clervaux
 Maulusmuhle (closed)
 Troisvierges
 Gouvy (Belgium)
 Vielsalm (Belgium)
 Trois-Ponts (Belgium)
 Coo (Belgium)
 Aywaille (Belgium)
 Rivage (Belgium)
 Poulseur (Belgium)
 Angleur (Belgium)
 Liège (Belgium)

References

Railway lines in Luxembourg